Sir John Charles Moir Mason  (13 May 1927 – 16 March 2008) was a British diplomat with Her Majesty's Diplomatic Service. He was the British Ambassador to Israel from 1976 to 1980, and then High Commissioner to Australia from 1980 to 1984. At the end of his term, he and his wife remained in Australia where they became citizens in 1987, and Mason worked as a business executive.

References

1927 births
2008 deaths
Military personnel from Manchester
British Army officers
High Commissioners of the United Kingdom to Australia
Ambassadors of the United Kingdom to Israel
Members of HM Diplomatic Service
Knights Commander of the Order of St Michael and St George
Australian Knights Commander of the Order of St Michael and St George
Alumni of Peterhouse, Cambridge
People educated at Manchester Grammar School
British Army personnel of the Korean War
British emigrants to Australia
Naturalised citizens of Australia
20th-century British diplomats